The Champion of the Colony Award is a list that was compiled in the 1940s and 1950s by Australian rules football historian Cecil Clarence Mullen (1895–1983) for Mullen's Australasian Footballers' Almanac in 1950, for Mullen's Footballers' Australian  Almanac in 1951, and for the History of Australian Rules Football in 1958.

According to Mullen's 1950 almanac, the Champion of the Colony was an annual award was originally based on votes by club captains and later by Melbourne's leading football journalists, which was the accepted historical interpretation of the title for many decades.

More recent research has failed to uncover any contemporary evidence of any such award having ever existed,  and it is now generally accepted that the list was compiled entirely by Mullen, based on newspaper reports that he had collected over many years.

Four lists
The final year for each of the lists produced by Mullen varied throughout his works: the 1950 Almanac finishes in 1949, the 1951 Almanac finishes in 1950, and the 1958 history finishes in 1940. A fourth list that is claimed to be based on Mullen's work, finishing in 1945, has been used since 2003 in official Australian Football League (AFL) publications, with the 2017 and 2018 AFL Season Guide noting the newspapers that Mullen used in compiling his list. 

The original list as compiled by Mullen contained multiple factual errors, while the 1945 version of the list contains anomalies compared to the lists of 1940, 1949 and 1950.

List of C. C. Mullen's Champions of the Colony

*  Player also won the Brownlow Medal that year. 
1 While Tom Wills is listed as champion in 1856, he did not arrive in Victoria until 23 December 1856 after having spent the last seven years in England and Ireland. 
2 The lists ending in 1940, 1949 and 1950 have the 1888 winner as Denis "Dinny" Mckay of South Melbourne, but the list ending in 1945 has his teammate Peter Burns as the 1888 winner. 
3 While Hugh Gavin of Essendon is listed as champion in 1903, he did not play for Essendon that year: he played for Boulder City in the Goldfields of Western Australia. 
4 While Roy Cazaly of South Melbourne is listed as champion in 1920, he did not play for South Melbourne until 1921: he played for St Kilda in 1911-1915 and 1918-1920. 
5 The lists ending in 1949 and 1950 have the 1941 winner as Ted Cordner of Melbourne and the 1942 winner as Jack Dyer of Richmond, but the list ending in 1945 has the 1941 winner as Wally Buttsworth of Essendon and the 1942 winner as Ted Cordner.

C. C. Mullen
The son of Alfred Raphael Mullen (1858-1913), and Eleanor Jane "Nellie" Mullen (1866-1938), née Rooking, Cecil Clarence Mullen was born in Richmond on 25 September 1895. He died at Kew on 4 April 1983. It is significant that, despite his birth and death records having him as Clarence Cecil Mullen, all of his electoral roll records have him as Cecil Clarence Mullen.

In addition to his work as a football umpire, journalist and football historian, he had a strong interest in (brass band) music, and was responsible for the formation of the Richmond Amateur Boy's Club — through which he was an early and significant influence on the cricket and the football of a number of prominent sportsmen, including George Bates, Syd Dineen, Neil Harvey, Tommy Lahiff, Jock McConchie, Bill Munn, Laurie Nash, Leo Opray, Ron Richards, Alby Pannam, George Smeaton, and Clarrie Vontom.

See also
History of Australian rules football in Victoria (1859–1900)

Notes

References

General
 de Korte, Jeremy (2020), "Cecil Clarence Mullen: Enthusiastic Commentator, Historian and Statistician of Brass and Military Bands", Band Blasts from the Past, 6 March 2020.
 Everett, L., "The Almanac 1950", footyalmanac.com, 11 November 2010.
 Richter, Armin (2014), "The Champions That Never Were", footyalmanac.com, 7 June 2014.
 Ruddell, Trevor (2010), "Introducing Cec Mullen: Pioneer Sports Historian", The Yorker: Journal of the Melbourne Cricket Club Library, No.43, (Spring 2010), p.2.
 Smith, Ross, (2009), "The non-existent Champion of the Colony award (1856-1945)", sportandhistory.com.

C. C. Mullen
 Mullen, C.C. (1934), "Left-Handers must be 'Natural': Value in England", The Sporting Globe, (Saturday, 15 December 1934), p.6.
 Mullen, C.C. (1940), "Australia does not have enough Military Bands: Bandsmen Are Hard to Find, and Many Prefer Technical Units on Account of the Rates of Pay", The Argus, (Saturday, 30 November 1940), p.1.
 Mullen, C.C. (1950), Mullen's Australasian Footballers' Almanac, Carlton: Horticultural Press.
 Mullen, C.C. (1951a), Mullen's Bandsmen of South Street (1900-1951), Carlton: Horticultural Press.
 Mullen, C.C. (1951b), Mullen's Footballers' Australian Almanac, Abbotsford: C.C. Mullen.
 Mullen, C.C. (1953), "Let's Remember Heroic League stars who Died at War", The Sporting Globe, (Saturday, 25 April 1953), p.4.
 Mullen, C.C. (1958), History of Australian Rules Football, 1858 to 1958, Carlton: Horticultural Press.
 Mullen, C.C. (1965), "Brass Bands have Played a Prominent Part in the History of Victoria", The Victorian Historical Magazine, Vol.36, No.139, (February 1965), pp.30-47. 

Australian Football League awards
Australian rules football awards